Ministry of Works and Transport can refer to:
Ministry of Works and Transport (Botswana)
Ministry of Works and Transport (Malaysia)
Ministry of Works and Transport (Namibia)
Ministry of Works and Transport (Uganda)